Dominic Smith (born 23 August 1993) is a British male acrobatic gymnast. With Alice Upcott, he was awarded the gold medal in the 2013 World Games, the gold medal at the 2013 Acrobatic Gymnastics European Championships and the silver medal in the 2014 Acrobatic Gymnastics World Championships.

Since June 2012, Smith is a member of Spelbound, the gymnastic group who rose to fame in 2010, winning the fourth series of Britain's Got Talent. The prize was £100,000 and the opportunity to appear at the 2010 Royal Variety Performance.

References

External links 

 

1993 births
Living people
British acrobatic gymnasts
Male acrobatic gymnasts
World Games gold medalists
Competitors at the 2013 World Games
Medalists at the Acrobatic Gymnastics World Championships
21st-century British people